Peringalkuthu Dam is a concrete dam built across the Chalakkudi River in Thrissur district, Kerala state of India. It also contains Peringalkuthu Hydro Electric Power Project of Kerala State Electricity Board who owns the dam. This is the first hydro electric power project to build on the Chalakkudi River. The gross storage capacity of the dam is 32 million cubic meters (1.13 tmc ft). The dam is situated in deep forest and special permission is needed to visit the dam.

Reservoir
The Poringalkuthu reservoir is created by constructing a dam across Chalakudy river. The inflow of Poringalkuthu reservoir is contributed partly from the tail water of upstream Sholayar HEP. In addition, the reservoir receives water from catchments downstream of Parambikulam and Thunakadavu dams of PAP Project. The spill waters of above dams also flow to this reservoir. The water from Poringalkuthu reservoir is diverted through a water conductor system to two Powerhouses of Poringalkuthu Hydro Electric Project (PHEP) & Porigalkuthu left bank Extension scheme located on the left bank of Chalakudy river. After generating power, the water is released to Chalakudy river itself.

Peringalkuthu left bank extension

The Peringalkuthu left bank extension project was made by laying an additional penstock from the Peringalkuthu reservoir and was done to avoid the spill from the dam during intense monsoon. Power house comprises one unit of 16 MW capacity. After power generation, water from Peringalkuthu & PLBE is released to the Chalakudi River.

See also
List of reservoirs and dams in India

References

Dams completed in 1957
Dams in Thrissur district
Reservoirs in Kerala
1957 establishments in Kerala
20th-century architecture in India